National University of Science and Technology (NUST) is a private university in Oman which was established in 2018 by merger of two professional colleges, Caledonian College of Engineering and Oman Medical College (which offered degree programs in medicine and pharmacy). Around 4300 international students from 33 countries have graduated from the university. NUST has academic partnerships with three international universities: Glasgow Caledonian University in Scotland, West Virginia University, U.S. and the University of South Carolina, U.S.

Academics 
 College of Engineering: The number of students is around  4000, from nationalities, and around 400 multinational academic, administrative and support staff.
 College of Medicine and Health Sciences: This is the only private College of Medicine and Health Sciences in Oman. It was established in 2001. Locals comprise 70% of the college population, and 30% are international students.
 College of Pharmacy: Beginning in 2003, Oman Medical College offered a Bachelor of Pharmacy program.  This program laid the groundwork for creation of NUST’s College of Pharmacy in 2018.

See also 
 List of universities and colleges in Oman
 Sultanate of Oman higher education ministry

References

External links
 

Universities and colleges in Muscat, Oman
Educational institutions established in 2018
2018 establishments in Oman
Private universities and colleges in Asia